Tunstall is a village and former civil parish, now in the parish of Halvergate, in the Broadland district of Norfolk, England. It lies some 14 miles (22.5 km) south-east of Norwich alongside the River Bure. In 1931 the parish had a population of 94. 

The ruinous mediaeval parish church of St Peter and St Paul is a grade II* listed building. Although repaired 1705  and extended in 1853, only the chancel is now usable. According to local legend, the church's bells were stolen by the Devil. He plunged with them into a nearby boggy pool, whence their tolling can occasionally be heard.

The Stracey Arms Windpump was once used to drain the surrounding marshland into the River Bure. A grade II* listed building, it is now maintained by the Norfolk Windmills Trust and is a visitor attraction.

History 
The villages name means 'Farmstead'. On 1 April 1935 the parish was abolished and merged with Halvergate.

References

Villages in Norfolk
Former civil parishes in Norfolk
Broadland